Russoft, headquartered in Saint-Petersburg, is an association of software companies from Russia, Ukraine and Belarus.  It was founded on September 9, 1999 and has merged with the Fort-Ross Consortium in May 2004. Today Russoft unites more than 80 companies with 7000+ programmers and software engineers with degrees in Technology & Computer Science. 

Similarly to Indian NASSCOM, Russoft was created to represent Russian software development companies on the global market, to enhance marketing and PR activities of its members, and to lobby their interests in their countries' governments.

Members of Russoft are companies meeting certain requirements of size and experience and paying an annual fee. Companies may be either full or associate members.

Russoft is a part of the Russian Information and Computer Industry Association (APKIT) where it plays the role of Software Development and Export Committee. Being a part of APKIT enhances Russoft's abilities to lobby the Government to support the IT industry.

Since 2001, in June every year, RUSSOFT has organized R.O.S.S. - or the 'Russian Outsourcing and Software Summit' - in St-Petersburg.

References

External links
Russoft: Official Web Site (English section, links to Russian-language version)
Russoft: 3rd Annual survey on Russian export market of software products, services and solutions
Russoft: 4th Annual survey on Russian export market of software products, services and solutions
Russoft: 6th Annual survey on Russian export market of software products, services and solutions

Trade associations based in Russia
Technology trade associations